Final Call is an album by Japanese New Age recording artist Kitaro, released by Domo Records on September 10, 2013. The album is a tribute to Kitaro's lifelong reverence of Nature, and a musical call to action to encourage everyone to take better care of how we treat our planet.

Commenting on Final Call, Kitaro said, "I have always felt we all must respect the providence of the Universe. Unfortunately, through the course of time and the growth of civilization, many living creatures that we now know will become extinct. If we don't alter how we treat each other and our planet Earth, many habitats and portions of this earth may become devastated and eventually disappear."

In December 2013, Final Call was nominated by The National Academy of Recording Arts & Sciences for Best New Age Album, becoming Kitaro's 15th Grammy Award nomination.

Track listing

Awards

Personnel
Kitaro - Producer, Composer, Arranger, Engineer, Keyboards, Percussion
Timothy Beach - Engineer
Tim Gennert - Mastering

Additional personnel
Eiichi Naito - Executive Producer, Management
Dino Malito - Artists & Repertoire, Management
Kio Griffith - Art Direction, Design
Atsuko Mizuta - Marketing & Promotions
Mai Okuno - Marketing & Promotions
Craig Melone - Liner Notes

References

External links
Kitaro official site
Kitaro Official Facebook
 Final Call Playlist on YouTube

2013 albums
Kitarō albums
New-age albums